Roland Kollmann (born 8 October 1976) is an Austrian former professional footballer who played as a striker. He played for Grazer AK until January 2012 when he moved to Carinthia (his "home province") and played for "SVG Bleiburg" (4th division) until November. He also was Bleiburg's team manager. In 2013 he moved to Florida in the USA and since 2013 is the Director of coaching at Schulz Academy in Boca Raton, Florida: Shultz Academy Site

Career statistics

Honours
Grazer AK
 Austrian Bundesliga: 2003–04
 Austrian Cup: 2001–02, 2003–04
 Austrian Supercup: 2002
 Austrian Regionalliga Central: 2011–12

FC Kärnten
 Austrian First League: 2000–01
 Austrian Cup: 2000–01

Individual
 Austrian Bundesliga top scorer: 2003–04 – 27 goals.

References

1976 births
Living people
Sportspeople from Villach
Footballers from Carinthia (state)
Austrian footballers
Austria international footballers
Association football forwards
Austrian Football Bundesliga players
2. Liga (Austria) players
Austrian Regionalliga players
Eredivisie players
FC Tirol Innsbruck players
FC Kärnten players
FC Twente players
Grazer AK players
SVG Bleiburg players
Austrian expatriate footballers
Austrian expatriate sportspeople in the Netherlands
Expatriate footballers in the Netherlands
Austrian expatriate sportspeople in the United States
Association football coaches